Marjorie Ann "Maan" Teodoro ( Ang) is a Filipina politician and teacher who has served as the representative for Marikina's 1st congressional district since 2022, as a member of the United Nationalist Alliance.

Congressional career 
In 2022, Teodoro ran for representative in Marikina's 1st congressional district to succeed the retiring Bayani Fernando, who ran against her husband in the mayoral race. She ran under the United Nationalist Alliance with the support of her husband's coalition, Team MarCy. In May 9, 2022, she handily defeated Migoy Cadiz of the Nationalist People's Coalition, with 73.61% of the vote.  

She took office on June 30, 2022. In the 19th Congress, Teodoro serves as an assistant majority leader.

Personal life 
Teodoro is married to Marcelino Teodoro, who has served as the mayor of Marikina since 2016. She has one daughter, Francesca Ysabela.

Electoral history

References 

Living people
People from Marikina
People from Rizal
United Nationalist Alliance politicians
Members of the House of Representatives of the Philippines from Marikina
Women members of the House of Representatives of the Philippines

Year of birth missing (living people)